Gilmania luteola (called golden carpet or goldencarpet) is a rare annual plant in the Buckwheat family (Polygonaceae).

It is found only on barren alkaline slopes in Death Valley California, especially near Artist's Palette.

The plant grows in mats very low to the ground. There are only five known occurrences as of 2013. It grows only in very wet years, which rarely occur in the region.

The yellow flowers are quite small, and the plant has greenish-yellowish foliage. It is the only species in the monotypic genus Gilmania.

References 

 Mojave Desert Wildflowers, Jon Mark Stewart, 1998, pg. 56

External links 
 Jepson Manual Treatment
 USDA Plants Profile
 Flora of North America
 Photo gallery

Monotypic Polygonaceae genera
Flora of California
Natural history of Inyo County, California
Flora without expected TNC conservation status